The Ottawa Technical Secondary School (name changed as of May 1, 2010) is an Ottawa-Carleton District School Board high school in Ottawa, Ontario, Canada. It specializes in teaching students trades. It is located on Donald Street, just east of the Vanier neighbourhood of Ottawa. Until 2001, it was known as McArthur High School . From 2001 until 2010 it was known as  Ottawa Technical Learning Centre.

The school opened in 1973 and was one of several vocational schools operated by the Ottawa Board of Education. In the 1990s, attendance was steadily declining, falling from a high of 800 students in 1980 to about 390 in 1996.  The school had a poor reputation due to its poor academic record and a history of violence and crime.  Around this time, all the other vocational schools in Ottawa were closed or converted into standard high schools. Because of the expense of its specialized programs and its low enrolment, McArthur came close to being closed.  In 2001, however, it was renamed and upgraded. Again, in 2010 the name was changed to Ottawa Technical Secondary School.  Due to the merger of various municipalities into the new City of Ottawa, it can draw on a much larger base of students. Its enrolment has rapidly increased, and around its rise, it was up to 600. However, the population has seemingly decreased in recent years, and is around 350 as of 2019–2020. The school continues to serve special needs students.  Increasingly, it also serves older students who have been away from school for some years.

After it was renamed, the school was upgraded and refurbished. The school board refused to pay for this, but a fundraising effort led by Dave Smith saw substantial donations of money and equipment allowing the school to expand and upgrade its programs.  A number of local business leaders supported the school due to the shortage of skilled tradespeople in the city.

OTSS educates for the world of work, providing life and vocational skills in an adaptive and diverse environment to encourage responsible citizenship.  The school offers a wide array of programs from the culinary arts to welding to auto-mechanics.  It is the only school in Ontario to offer courses in several of the areas. Students can receive a high school diploma, but most do not, instead staying only long enough to obtain a certificate in a certain trade. In higher grades, students spend much of their time in co-operative education programs. The severe shortage in skilled blue-collar workers across Canada has meant that most graduates quickly find employment.

See also
List of high schools in Ontario

References

External links
School Website
OCDSB Website
2009-2010 OCDSB School Profile

High schools in Ottawa
Educational institutions established in 1973
1973 establishments in Ontario